Persecution in Madrid (Spanish:Persecución en Madrid) is a 1952 Spanish crime film directed by Enrique Gómez.

Cast
 Francisco Albiñana 
 Barta Barri 
 Roberto Camardiel 
 Isabel de Castro 
 María Victoria Durá 
 Ramón Fernández 
 María Francés
 Manuel Gas 
 Ramón Giner 
 Liria Izquierdo 
 Manuel Monroy
 José Morales 
 Silvia Morgan 
 Manolo Morán 
 Carlos Otero 
 Fernando Porredón 
 Luis Pérez de León 
 Miguel Ángel Valdivieso

References

Bibliography 
 Bentley, Bernard. A Companion to Spanish Cinema. Boydell & Brewer 2008.

External links 
 

1952 crime films
Spanish crime films
1952 films
1950s Spanish-language films
Films directed by Enrique Gómez
Films with screenplays by Ignacio F. Iquino
Spanish black-and-white films
Films scored by Augusto Algueró
1950s Spanish films